Artillery plant is a common name for several plants in the genus Pilea and may refer to:

Pilea microphylla
Pilea trianthemoides, native to Florida and the Caribbean
Lamium galeobdolon